
Gmina Koniecpol is an urban-rural gmina (administrative district) in Częstochowa County, Silesian Voivodeship, in southern Poland.

Villages
Apart from the town of Koniecpol, Gmina Koniecpol contains the villages and settlements of Aleksandrów (village with sołectwo status), Aleksandrów (sołectwo Wąsosz), Borek, Dąbrowa, Kozaków, Kuźnica Grodziska, Kuźnica Wąsowska, Łabędź, Luborcza, Ludwinów, Łysaków, Łysiny, Michałów, Oblasy, Okołowice, Pękowiec, Piaski, Pod Jantym, Radoszewnica, Rudniki, Rudniki-Kolonia, Siernicze-Gajówka, Stanisławice, Stary Koniecpol, Stefanów, Teodorów, Teresów, Wąsosz, Wólka, Zagacie, Załęże and Zaróg.

Neighbouring gminas
Gmina Koniecpol is bordered by the gminas of Dąbrowa Zielona, Lelów, Przyrów, Secemin, Szczekociny, Włoszczowa and Żytno.

Twin towns – sister cities

Gmina Koniecpol is twinned with:
 Sniatyn, Ukraine

References

Koniecpol
Częstochowa County